Focaccia is a flat leavened oven-baked Italian bread, similar in style and texture to pizza; in some places, it is called  ("white pizza"). Focaccia can be served as a side dish or as sandwich bread and it can be round, rectangular, or square shape.

Etymology and terminology

In Ancient Rome,  was a flat bread baked on the hearth. The word is derived from the Latin  'hearth, place for baking'.  The basic recipe is thought by some to have originated with the Etruscans, but today it is widely associated with Ligurian cuisine, while outside Liguria the word usually refers to the Genoese variants.

The first attestation of the word  dates back to the 14th century.

Focaccia is sometimes considered to be a kind of pizza, though focaccia is left to rise after being flattened, while pizza is baked immediately.

Regional variants

Focaccia genovese 
 ('Genoese focaccia'), marked by its finger-sized holes on its surface ( in Genoese dialect), is brushed or sprinkled with olive oil, coarse salt, and sometimes water before the final rise.

In Genoa, focaccia is eaten in the morning at breakfast or during the day. It is often dipped in milk or in cappuccino at breakfast and eaten warm and wet.

Ligurian variants 
Focaccia has countless variations along the Ligurian coast, from the biscuit-hard  ('dry focaccia') to the corn-flour, oily, soft Voltri version, some bearing little resemblance to the Genoese version.

This version has stracchino cheese sandwiched between two layers of paper-thin dough.

Other versions have a surface covered with sauce or ham.

Other variants 
In Northeast Italy,  ('Venetian focaccia') is typical for Easter; it is based on eggs, sugar and butter and it is similar to panettone and pandoro.

In South Tyrol and the Austrian village of Krimml,  (locally ) is a traditional Easter gift from godparents to their godchildren. It is made slightly thinner in the centre so that dyed eggs can be placed there.

The traditional variant from Bari, is prepared with durum wheat flour and topped with tomatoes.

Focaccia al rosmarino
 ('focaccia with rosemary') is topped with rosemary.  It may be served as an antipasto, table bread, or snack. Whole or sliced fresh rosemary leaves may be used, as can dried rosemary. It may be garnished with sprigs of fresh rosemary after baking and sprinkled with salt. Potato rosemary focaccia is often called "potato pizza" in New York City.

Although rosemary is the most common herb used to flavor focaccia, sage is also used, and the variant is called .

 may have a moist texture, and the exact recipe varies. It may be savory or sweet. It is typically baked, although it is sometimes fried. Garlic or basil may be added. It may be used in the preparation of sandwiches.

See also

 Fougasse (bread)
 Pogača
 Panfocaccia
 Sicilian pizza
 List of Italian dishes
 List of pizza varieties by country
 Coca (pastry)
 Cuisine of Liguria

Notes

References

Further reading

 

Flatbreads
Italian breads
Cuisine of Liguria
Monegasque cuisine
Yeast breads
Street food in Italy